Tom Breese (born 26 September 1991) is an English mixed martial artist who competes in the Middleweight division of Konfrontacja Sztuk Walki (KSW). A professional competitor since 2010, he formerly competed for the Ultimate Fighting Championship and BAMMA. He is currently ranked #4 in the KSW Middleweight rankings.

Mixed martial arts career

Early career
Born in Birmingham to a Welsh father and an English mother, Breese began training MMA at the age of 16. A successful wrestler and jiu-jitsu competitor, he won a junior national freestyle wrestling championship, as well as a second-place finish at the IBJJF world championships when he was a purple belt. Breese compiled an amateur record of 3–0–1 before successfully making his professional debut for BAMMA in 2010.

Breese fought exclusively in his native England and amassed an undefeated record of 7–0 with all but one win coming by way of submission before joining the Ultimate Fighting Championship in 2015.

Ultimate Fighting Championship
Breese made his promotional debut against Luiz Dutra Jr. on 30 May 2015 at UFC Fight Night 67. Breese won the fight via TKO in the first round after dropping his opponent with a straight left and following up with ground and pound.

Breese faced Cathal Pendred on 24 October 2015 at UFC Fight Night 76. Breese dominated the fight with striking exchanges en route to another TKO victory in the first round. In similar fashion to his UFC debut, Breese dropped his opponent with a straight left and followed up with ground and pound to earn the TKO victory. The win also earned him his first Performance of the Night bonus award.

Breese faced Keita Nakamura on 27 February 2016 at UFC Fight Night 84. He won the fight via unanimous decision.

Breese faced Sean Strickland on 4 June 2016 at UFC 199. He lost the fight via split decision, marking the first loss in Breese's career.

Breese was expected to face Oluwale Bamgbose on 18 March 2017 at UFC Fight Night 107. However, on the day of the event, Breese was deemed unfit to compete and the bout was cancelled.

Breese faced Dan Kelly on 27 May 2018 at UFC Fight Night 130. He won the fight via technical knockout in round one. This win earned him the Performance of the Night award.

Breese was expected to face Cezar Ferreira on 17 November 2018 at UFC Fight Night 140. However, it was reported on 9 November 2018 that Breese pulled out of the event due to injury and was replaced by Ian Heinisch.

Breese was expected to face Alessio Di Chirico on 16 March 2019 at UFC Fight Night 147. However, Di Chirico pulled out of the fight in early January citing an undisclosed injury and subsequent surgery. He was replaced by Cezar Ferreira. However, on 1 February 2019 Ferreira withdrew from the fight, citing a knee injury, and was replaced by Ian Heinisch. In turn, Breese withdrew from the fight against Heinisch due to health concerns.

Breese faced Brendan Allen on 29 February 2020 at UFC Fight Night 169. He lost the fight via TKO in the first round.

Breese was scheduled to meet Roman Kopylov on 4 October 2020 at UFC on ESPN: Holm vs. Aldana. However, Kopylov was removed from the bout for undisclosed reason and he was replaced by KB Bhullar. The fight took place a week later at UFC Fight Night: Moraes vs. Sandhagen. Breese won the fight via technical knockout in round one. This win earned him the Performance of the Night award.

Breese was expected to face Omari Akhmedov on 16 January 2021 at UFC on ABC 1. During fight week, the UFC opted to move the bout to UFC on ESPN: Chiesa vs. Magny. He lost the bout via second round arm triangle submission.

Breese was scheduled to face Antônio Arroyo on 5 June 2021 at UFC Fight Night: Rozenstruik vs. Sakai. However, the fight would be cancelled a few hours before it was to take place due to medical issues suffered by Breese.

Levels Fight League 
After the pull out from his last bout, Breese was released from the UFC and signed a multi-fight deal with Levels Fight League. Breese made his debut against David Ramirez at LFL 4 on March 13, 2022. He won the fight by submission due to rear naked choke at 1:46 of the second round, winning the LFL Middleweight title in the process.

Breese defended his title against Ahmed Sami at Levels Fight League 5 on June 26, 2022. He won the bout and kept the title, submitting Sami in the second round via guillotine choke.

Konfrontacja Sztuk Walki 
Breese made his KSW debut against Damian Janikowski on September 10, 2022 at KSW 74, controversially winning via guillotine choke in the second round, with the bout being stopped after the ref thought that Janikowski tapped when he said he didn't.

In his sophomore performance, Breese faced Paweł Pawlak on November 12, 2022 at KSW 76: Parnasse vs. Rajewski, losing the bout via ground and pound TKO in the first round.

Breese faced Bartosz Leśko on March 17, 2023 at KSW 80: Ruchała vs. Eskiev, submitting him via rear-naked choke in the first round.

Championships and achievements
Ultimate Fighting Championship
Performance of the Night (Three times) 
BAMMA 
BAMMA RDX Welterweight Championship (One time) 
Levels Fight League 
LFL Middleweight Championship (One time; two title defenses)

Mixed martial arts record

|-
|Win
|align=center|16–4
|Bartosz Leśko
|Submission (rear-naked choke)
|KSW 80: Ruchała vs. Eskiev
|
|align=center|1
|align=center|2:45
|Lubin, Poland
| 
|-
|Loss
|align=center|15–4
|Paweł Pawlak
|TKO (elbow and punches)
|KSW 76: Parnasse vs. Rajewski
|
|align=center|1
|align=center|3:54
|Grodzisk Mazowiecki, Poland
| 
|-
|Win
|align=center|15–3
|Damian Janikowski
|Submission (guillotine choke)
|KSW 74: De Fries vs. Prasel
|
|align=center|2
|align=center|1:53
|Ostrów Wielkopolski, Poland
|
|-
|Win
|align=center|14–3
|Ahmed Sami
|Submission (guillotine choke)
|Levels Fight League 5
|
|align=center|2
|align=center|1:52
|Amsterdam, The Netherlands
|
|-
|Win
|align=center|13–3
|David Ramires
|Submission (rear-naked choke)
|Levels Fight League 4
|
|align=center|2
|align=center|1:46
|Amsterdam, The Netherlands
|
|-
|Loss
|align=center|12–3
|Omari Akhmedov
|Submission (arm-triangle choke)
|UFC on ESPN: Chiesa vs. Magny 
|
|align=center|2
|align=center|1:41
|Abu Dhabi, United Arab Emirates
| 
|-
|Win
|align=center|12–2
|KB Bhullar
|TKO (punches)
|UFC Fight Night: Moraes vs. Sandhagen
|
|align=center|1
|align=center|1:43
|Abu Dhabi, United Arab Emirates
|
|-
|Loss
|align=center|11–2
|Brendan Allen
|TKO (elbows and punches)
|UFC Fight Night: Benavidez vs. Figueiredo 
|
|align=center|1
|align=center|4:47
|Norfolk, Virginia, United States
|
|-
| Win
| align=center|11–1
| Dan Kelly
| TKO (punches)
| UFC Fight Night: Thompson vs. Till
| 
| align=center| 1
| align=center| 3:33
| Liverpool, England
| 
|-
| Loss
| align=center| 10–1
| Sean Strickland
| Decision (split)
| UFC 199
| 
| align=center| 3
| align=center| 5:00
| Inglewood, California, United States
|  
|-
| Win
| align=center| 10–0
| Keita Nakamura
| Decision (unanimous)	
| UFC Fight Night: Silva vs. Bisping
| 
| align=center| 3
| align=center| 5:00
| London, England
| 
|-
| Win
| align=center| 9–0
| Cathal Pendred
| TKO (punches)
| UFC Fight Night: Holohan vs. Smolka 
| 
| align=center| 1
| align=center| 4:37
| Dublin, Ireland
| 
|-
| Win
| align=center| 8–0
| Luiz Dutra Jr.
| TKO (punches) 
| UFC Fight Night: Condit vs. Alves
| 
| align=center| 1
| align=center| 4:58
| Goiânia, Brazil
| 
|-
| Win
| align=center| 7–0
| Thibaud Larchet
| Submission (rear-naked choke)
| CWFC 74 
| 
| align=center| 3
| align=center| 4:57
| London, England
| 
|-
| Win
| align=center| 6–0
| Warren Kee
| Submission (rear-naked choke) 
| BAMMA 11
| 
| align=center| 1
| align=center| 3:06
| Birmingham, England
|
|-
| Win
| align=center| 5–0
| Jack Magee
| Submission (triangle choke)
| BAMMA 10 
| 
| align=center| 1
| align=center| 3:19
| London, England
| 
|-
| Win
| align=center| 4–0
| Mark Tucker
| TKO (knee to the body) 
| BAMMA 9
| 
| align=center| 2
| align=center| 1:40
| Birmingham, England
| 
|-
| Win
| align=center| 3–0
| Qasim Shafiq
| Submission (triangle choke)
| BAMMA 8
| 
| align=center| 1
| align=center| 4:20
| Nottingham, England
| 
|-
| Win
| align=center| 2–0
| Lee Taylor
| Submission (rear-naked choke)
| BAMMA 7
| 
| align=center| 1
| align=center| 2:26
| Birmingham, England
| 
|-
| Win
| align=center| 1–0
| Shahid Hussain
| Submission (rear-naked choke)
| BAMMA 4
| 
| align=center| 2
| align=center| 2:57
| Birmingham, England
|

See also
List of current KSW fighters
List of male mixed martial artists

References

External links

Living people
1991 births
English male mixed martial artists
Sportspeople from Birmingham, West Midlands
Welterweight mixed martial artists
Mixed martial artists utilizing wrestling
Mixed martial artists utilizing Brazilian jiu-jitsu
People awarded a black belt in Brazilian jiu-jitsu
English practitioners of Brazilian jiu-jitsu
Ultimate Fighting Championship male fighters